Major General Willard Ames Holbrook (July 23, 1860 – July 18, 1932) was a United States Army officer who served for almost forty years. Coming from a family with long military tradition, he was the father of future Brigadier General Willard Ames Holbrook Jr. and brother of Major General Lucius Roy Holbrook.

Early life 
Holbrook was born on July 23, 1860, in Arkansaw, Wisconsin. He graduated from the United States Military Academy in 1885. Among his classmates were future general officers such as Robert Lee Bullard, Joseph E. Kuhn, Beaumont B. Buck, Charles Henry Muir, William Franklin Martin, George Washington Burr, Daniel Bradford Devore. He was assigned to the 1st Cavalry Regiment (later he was assigned to the 7th Cavalry Regiment).

Military career 
[[

Holbrook was stationed in Cuba during the Spanish–American War.  From 1901 to 1902, following the war, he served as Civil Governor of Antique, Philippines.

After America entered World War I in April 1917, Holbrook was promoted to brigadier general in command of the 165th Infantry Brigade. In April 1918, he was further promoted to major general and placed in command of the 9th Infantry Division. Holbrook's final assignment was as Chief of the U.S. Cavalry. He retired from the Army on July 23, 1924.

Marriage and children
In 1902, Holbrook married Anna Huntington Stanley (1864 – 1907), daughter of Major General David S. Stanley.
 Willard Ames Holbrook Jr. – served as brigadier general
 David Stanley Holbrook – served as a first lieutenant and died from a gunshot wound in the Philippines in 1926.

Death
Holbrook died at the Walter Reed Army Medical Center in Washington, D.C., on July 18, 1932. He is buried at Arlington National Cemetery along with his wife, Anna, and son, David.

Awards
His military awards include the Army Distinguished Service Medal, the citation for which reads:

See also
 5th Cavalry Regiment (United States)
 17th Cavalry Regiment (United States)
 Lucius Roy Holbrook

References

External links

|-

1860 births
1932 deaths
United States Army Cavalry Branch personnel
United States Army generals
Recipients of the Distinguished Service Medal (US Army)
American military personnel of the Spanish–American War
United States Military Academy alumni
Military personnel from Wisconsin
People from Waterville, Wisconsin
United States Army generals of World War I
Burials at Arlington National Cemetery